Bonneveau is a commune in the Loir-et-Cher department in central France.

Population

Sights and monuments
 Château de Matval, 13-15th century castle, protected since 1971 as a monument historique by the French Ministry of Culture
 Église Saint-Jean-Baptiste, church of John the Baptist, classified since 1961 as a monument historique by the French Ministry of Culture

See also
Communes of the Loir-et-Cher department

References

Communes of Loir-et-Cher